Feni University (FU) is a private university established in 2012 under the 2010 Private University Act. The campus is in Feni, Bangladesh. It started academic activity in May 2013. The university was formally granted by UGC in November 2012.

Campus
Feni University's temporary campus is at Barahipur in Feni Sadar Upazila. For the establishment of permanent campus, three acres of land has been purchased beside Dhaka-Chittagong Highway at Muhammad Ali Market in Feni .

Administration 
The current president of the board of trustees is Alauddin Ahmed Chowdhury, a former protocol officer under the prime minister of Bangladesh. Vice Chancellor is Professor Dr. M. Jamaluddin Ahmed, FRSC, FRS, who previously served as Professor and Department Head of Chemistry, University of Chittagong. Treasurer is Professor Taibul Hoque, who previously served as Principal of Feni Govt. College.

Faculties
Feni University currently has 3 Faculties.

Faculty of Business Administration
 Bachelor of Business Administration (BBA)
 Executive Master of Business Administration (EMBA)
 Master of Business Administration (MBA)
 Regular Master of Business Administration (RMBA)

Faculty of Science & Engineering
 B.Sc. in Civil Engineering(CE)
 B.Sc. in Computer Science and Engineering(CSE)
 B.Sc. in Electrical and Electronics Engineering (EEE)
 M.Sc. in Mathematics

Faculty of Arts, Social Sciences & Law
 Bachelor of Arts in English (BA)
 Bachelor of Law (LLB)
 Master of Arts in English (MAE, 1 year)
 Master of Arts in English (MAE, 2 year)
 PGD in Library and Information Sciences

References

External links
 

Educational institutions established in 2012
Private universities in Bangladesh
2012 establishments in Bangladesh